Clearweed is a common name for several plants and may refer to:

Pilea fontana
Pilea pumila, native to Asia and eastern North America